George Merrick Brooks (July 26, 1824 – September 22, 1893) was a U.S. Representative from Massachusetts.

Born in Concord, Massachusetts, Brooks attended an academy in Concord and a boarding school at Waltham.
He graduated from Harvard University in 1844.
He studied law.
He was admitted to the bar in 1847 and commenced practice in Concord.
He served as member of the State house of representatives in 1858.
He served in the State senate in 1859.

Brooks was elected as a Republican to the Forty-first Congress to fill the vacancy caused by the resignation of George S. Boutwell.
He was reelected to the Forty-second Congress and served from November 2, 1869, to May 13, 1872, when he resigned, having been appointed to a judicial position.
He served as judge of probate for Middlesex County and served until his death in Concord, Massachusetts, September 22, 1893.
He was interred in Sleepy Hollow Cemetery.

He was the brother-in-law of US Attorney General Ebenezer Rockwood Hoar, through the marriage of his sister Caroline Downes Brooks Hoar.

References

External links
The Brooks House
Nathan Brooks Papers (Father)
George Merrick Brooks Find A Grave
George Merrick Brooks US House Biography

1824 births
1893 deaths
Harvard University alumni
People from Concord, Massachusetts
Republican Party members of the United States House of Representatives from Massachusetts
19th-century American politicians